Bidestan (also Romanized as Bīdestān) is a city in Mohammadiyeh District, Alborz County, Qazvin Province, Iran. At the 2006 census its population was 20,110, in 5,263 families.

References 

Alborz County
Cities in Qazvin Province